Western China (or rarely ) is the west of China. In the definition of the Chinese government, Western China covers one municipality (Chongqing), six provinces (Sichuan, Guizhou, Yunnan, Shaanxi, Gansu, and Qinghai), and three autonomous regions (Tibet, Ningxia, and Xinjiang).

History 
The term Xiyu (meaning "Western regions") is a historical label applied to western China. The geography encompassed with the phrase Xiyu changed over time based on political conditions, but one constant is that it includes the area of present day Xinjiang and the area now described as Central Asia. The earliest Chinese political control of the region began in 60 BCE, when China established a military and administrative office which was responsible for what would be present day Xinjiang and parts of Central Asia.

Administrative divisions

Cities with urban area over one million in population
Provincial capitals in bold.

See also 
 China Western Development
 Northwest China
 Southwest China
 West China Union College
 West China Union University
Other regions
 East China
 North China
 Northeast China
 Northern and southern China
 South Central China

References

External links 
 Western Regional Development 

 
Regions of China
Inner Asia